Biochemistry and Cell Biology is a bi-monthly, peer-reviewed scientific journal of biochemistry and cell biology established in 1964 by NRC Research Press. It is the continuation of Canadian Journal of Biochemistry and Physiology which split into Canadian Journal of Biochemistry and Canadian Journal of Physiology and Pharmacology in 1964. In 1983, Canadian Journal of Biochemistry was renamed  Canadian Journal of Biochemistry and Cell Biology and acquired its current name Biochemistry and Cell Biology in 1986.

The journal is edited by James R. Davie (University of Manitoba) and Christopher J. Nelson (University of Victoria). The journal is affiliated with the Canadian Society for Molecular Biosciences and the Panamerican Association for Biochemistry and Molecular Biology.

Abstracting and indexing 
 Biochemistry and Biophysics Citation Index
 Biological & Agricultural Index Plus
 Biomedical Reference Collection
 BIOSIS
 CAB Abstracts
 Chemical Abstracts
 Compendex
 Current Abstracts
 Current Awareness in Biological Sciences
 Current Contents
 Derwent Biotechnology Abstracts
 Elsevier BIOBASE
 EMBASE
 Genetics Abstracts
 MEDLINE
 Science Citation Index

External links 
 

Publications established in 1964
Biochemistry journals
Molecular and cellular biology journals
Canadian Science Publishing academic journals
English-language journals
Bimonthly journals